Leftover Salmon is an American jam band from Boulder, Colorado, formed in 1989. The band's music is a blend of bluegrass, rock, country, and Cajun/Zydeco.  Over their thirty years as a band Salmon have released seven studio albums and three live albums.  The band celebrated their continuing thirty-year career with the release of the biographical book, Leftover Salmon: Thirty Years of Festival! and a vinyl box-set re-release of all of their studio albums.

History
The band formed in 1989, when members of the Salmon Heads, Vince Herman, Dave Dorian, and Gerry Cavagnaro, combined with members of the Left Hand String Band, Drew Emmitt and Glenn Keefe, to play a New Year's Eve show in 1989 at the Eldo in Crested Butte.  Herman had previously played with Emmitt in the Left Hand String Band, and had called on his former bandmates Emmitt and Keefe to fill in for some missing members of the Salmon Heads for the New Year's Eve show.  They chose the name Leftover Salmon on the drive to the show.

The synergy worked and the result was Leftover Salmon. The lineup changed significantly over the years, but the "Big Three" – Drew Emmitt, Vince Herman and Mark Vann — remained the heart of the band until Vann's death in 2002.

After the independent release of Bridges to Bert in 1993  and the 1995 live follow-up Ask the Fish, Leftover Salmon gained a spot on the H.O.R.D.E. festival tour and a contract with Hollywood Records. Their Hollywood debut and second studio album, Euphoria with guest keyboardist Pete Sears, continued to define their eclectic sound and introduced many songs that became their most notable. They released four albums with the Disney owned label. In 2000, Bill McKay, formerly of the Derek Trucks Band, joined the band on keyboards and vocals and the band recorded several of his songs. He remained with the band until late 2011.

In March 2002, founding member and banjoist Mark Vann died from cancer. He was succeeded by Matt Flinner and then Noam Pikelny.

In 2004, the band announced they were going on hiatus at the end of that year.

An award-nominated documentary film of Leftover Salmon, titled Years in Your Ears, was released on DVD in November 2006.

Leftover Salmon reunited in 2007 and played six performances, including the High Sierra Music Festival in Quincy, California, the All Good Festival in West Virginia, as well as Denver and Boulder, Colorado shows in late December. Leftover Salmon marked their unofficial return to the stage with a performance at the Telluride Bluegrass Festival on Sunday, June 24, 2007, as "Drew Emmitt and Vince Herman and Friends."  They were introduced by Jeff Austin of Yonder Mountain String Band with the line, "We know what it might say in the program, but I think we all really know what's going on here."

Despite their various successful side projects, Leftover Salmon played seven times during the summer of 2008 and 2009. For a special New Years run, the band celebrated 20 years as a band by returning to the site of their first show in Crested Butte, Colorado: The Eldo. The band played four shows through Denver and Boulder Colorado during this run while celebrating their 20th anniversary. Since moving Andy Thorn in to the banjo role, the band has been touring more than usual with small runs throughout the country.

On May 22, 2012, the band released their first album since their hiatus. The album was called Aquatic Hitchhiker. An extensive promotional tour followed including the Summer Camp Music Festival and the Telluride Bluegrass Festival.

Starting on June 19, 2012, the band is the featured "house band" at the Whales Tail Bar in Breckenridge, Colorado on the Deadliest Catch - After the Catch episodes.

In 2015, they released the studio album High Country and the following year released a compilation double album of live performances with the title 25.  They released their next studio album, Something Higher, in 2018.

As the band neared their 30th anniversary they were profiled in the book Leftover Salmon: Thirty Years of Festival! by author Tim Newby.  The book chronicled the band's long influential history and their role in the development of the jamband and jamgrass scenes. In 2019, keyboardist Erik Deutsch left the group to join the Dixie Chicks.

Band members

Current members
Vince Herman – Vocals, Guitar, Washboard (1989–present)
Drew Emmitt – Vocals, Mandolin, Fiddle, Electric Guitar (1989–present)
Greg Garrison – Bass, Vocals (2000–present)
Andy Thorn – Banjo, Electric Banjo, Vocals (2010–present)
Alwyn Robinson – Drums, Vocals (2013–present)
Jay Starling - keyboard, dobro (2022-present)

Former members
Mark Vann – Banjo, Electric Banjo (1989–2002)
Michael Wooten – Drums (1989–1997)
Glenn Keefe – Bass (1989–1993)
Joe Jogerst – Keyboards (1989–1993)
Tye North – Bass (1993–2000)
Jeff Sipe – Drums (1997–2000, 2009–2011)
Noam Pikelny – Banjo, Electric Banjo (2002–2008)
Matt Flinner – Banjo (2009–2010)
Bill McKay – Keyboards, Vocals (2000–2011)
Jose Martinez – Drums (2000–2013)
Bill Payne – Piano, Organ, Vocals (2014-2015)
Erik Deutsch – Keyboards (2016–2020)

Featured artists

 Danny Boone, featured in The Nashville Sessions
 Waylon Jennings
 Randy Scruggs

Selective discography

Albums

Leftover Salmon

Collaboration
 O' Cracker Where Art Thou? (Pitch a Tent), 2003 (with Cracker)

Videos
 Years In Your Ears ...a Story of Leftover Salmon (2006, DVD)

References

External links
 Leftover Salmon
 Leftover Salmon collection at the Internet Archive's live music archive
 Years In Your Ears ...a Story of Leftover Salmon DVD

American bluegrass music groups
Culture of Boulder, Colorado
Jam bands
Musical groups from Colorado
Musical groups reestablished in 2007
Zydeco musicians